Miomantis mombasica is a species of praying mantis in the family Miomantidae, native to Africa.

It is named after Mombasa in Kenya.

See also
Mantodea of Africa 
List of mantis genera and species

References

mombasica
Mantodea of Africa
Insects of Kenya